José Adolfo Mojica Morales (September 26, 1936 – March 2, 2012) was the Roman Catholic bishop of the Roman Catholic Diocese of Sonsonate, El Salvador.

Ordained to the priesthood in 1964, Mojica Morales became bishop in 1989, retiring in 2011.

Notes

1936 births
2012 deaths
20th-century Roman Catholic bishops in El Salvador
21st-century Roman Catholic bishops in El Salvador
Roman Catholic bishops of Sonsonate